The transport of concentration camp inmates to Tyrol refers to a transfer of 139 high-profile prisoners (Prominenten) of the Nazi regime in the final weeks of the Second World War in Europe from Dachau Concentration Camp in Bavaria to South Tyrol.

The transport is notable for involving a confrontation between the escorting SS and SD detachments and a force of the German Army (Heer) in Niederdorf.  Ultimately, the SS/SD were faced with overwhelming firepower and stood down, whereupon the army unit "adopted" the Prominenten and escorted them to their final destination at the Hotel Pragser Wildsee some 12 km off. There, the prisoners were protected from both fanatical German forces and Italian partisans until relieved by a company of the US 5th Army on May 4, 1945.

Background
This movement was personally ordered by Adolf Hitler and actioned by Gestapo chief SS Gruppenführer Heinrich Müller. This group of Prominenten comprised men, women and children from seventeen nations. Almost a third were relatives of Colonel Claus von Stauffenberg and other leaders of the attempted assassination of Adolf Hitler in July 1944. They had been imprisoned under the Sippenhaft (kin detention) law which punished relatives of those accused of crimes against the state. The remainder included renegade Soviet generals, former collaborators from a number of Axis countries, a couple of Mussolini's Police Chiefs, some senior Nazi politicians and German Army officers who had simply fallen out with Hitler. In addition, there were a number of saboteurs, spies, traitors, resistance fighters, church leaders and four survivors of the Great Escape. It also included many wives and children of key prisoners.

It was intended that these prisoners should be held as hostages in the hopes of trading their lives for some concession from the Allies as the war wore down, or after hostilities ended. The prisoners were gathered together and escorted by a detachment of SS-TV (SS-Totenkopfverbände -  ) and SD (Sicherheitsdienst des Reichsführers-SS - Security Service) troopers.

Timeline of events

Evacuation from Dachau to the South Tyrol 

On 17, 24 and 26 April 1945 small convoys of buses and trucks began transporting the Prominenten from Dachau toward the SS-Sonderlager Innsbruck. On 27 April the prisoners began what transpired to be the final leg of their journey to a large lake-side hotel at Pragser Wildsee in the Italian Tyrol 12.5 km south west of Niederdorf, then still occupied by three German Luftwaffe generals and their staffs.

Making its way over the Brenner Pass the convoy entered the Italian Tyrol through the Puster Valley and eventually stopped the following morning, just outside the small village of Niederdorf (German) - Villabassa (Italian), South Tyrol, 70 km north-east of Bolzano.

Delay in Niederdorf 

In command of the SS-TV detachment was Obersturmführer Edgar Stiller, who was responsible for the transport, accommodation and general custody of the hostages. The commander of the SD detachment, Obersturmführer Friedrich Bader, was also a Gestapo officer. His responsibility was to carry out whatever final orders were received from Berlin in connection with the hostages, or to execute them in the event of any resistance or rescue attempts.

As a result of the chaotic conditions in Berlin nearly all communication systems were down.  Without specific orders Stiller was uncertain what to do and the situation became increasingly tense.  Upon arrival at Niederdorf the prisoners took matters into their own hands by leaving the transports and walking into the village. A local official (also an Italian Resistance leader) arranged temporary accommodation for the hostages in village hotels and the Town Hall.

During the morning of 28 April one of the hostages searched the wallet of an SD man who had collapsed from drunkenness.  A document in it called for the execution of 28 members of the Prominenten, including all the British officers and other military prisoners. Many of the SD and SS guards had been drinking and were becoming steadily more aggressive.

On Sunday 29 April, Colonel Bogislaw von Bonin, who had been imprisoned for disobeying Hitler by authorising Army Group A to retreat from Warsaw in January 1945, approached the local Wehrmacht liaison office in Niederdorf and asked them to contact his old friend, Colonel General Heinrich von Vietinghoff, the commander of Army Group C with headquarters in Bolzano, Italy, on the phone. He wasn't available but von Bonin was able to speak to another friend, General Hans Röttiger, Vietinghoff's Chief of Staff, and explain the highly dangerous situation and the need for assistance. 

Vietinghoff rang back two hours later to say he would send a Wehrmacht officer and a company of infantry to provide safe custody for the hostages. In the meantime, contingency plans were being made by the prisoners to attack the SS and SD troopers who were becoming increasingly threatening. Tasked with the rescue of the Prominenten, Wehrmacht Captain Wichard von Alvensleben made a reconnaissance trip to Niederdorf later that evening. Almost immediately he bumped into Obersturmführer Stiller. Von Alvensleben, realising that this officer must have a connection with the hostages, engaged him in conversation without revealing his mission. Stiller explained that he had relinquished his authority over the prisoners to one of the British officers but expressed great concern over what might happen when his second in command, an unpredictable SD Obersturmführer, learned of his decision.

Von Alvensleben returned to his quarters at Sexten, some 17 km east of Niederdorf to reflect on his next course of action. He had received neither permission nor an order to act against the SS; no superior in his chain of command had the authority to issue either, with the exception of his brother SS-Sturmbannfuehrer Ludolf Jakob von Alvensleben, who commanded all SS units in Adria West at the time.

At dawn on Monday 30 April, von Alvensleben returned to Niederdorf with two of his men. The party soon encountered a second SS Obersturmführer, the belligerent member of the SD he had been warned of by Stiller, Friedrich Bader. Von Alvensleben immediately engaged him, again without revealing his mission. Initially reluctant to discuss the hostages, Bader eventually stated that his orders would only be fulfilled when all the Prominenten were dead.

Standoff between the Wehrmacht and the SS/SD 
At this point von Alvensleben explained that he was an emissary of the Commander-in-Chief of Army Group C and that Bader should consider his orders fulfilled and his mission over. In fact the Wehrmacht captain had no authority to negotiate or give orders to the SS. In any event Bader refused to accept his instructions. With only two men at his disposal, von Alvensleben was in an untenable position. He withdrew and quickly radioed his battalion headquarters at Sexten with a request for a battle group to be despatched to Niederdorf immediately. 

Forty-five minutes later fifteen Wehrmacht NCOs armed with machine pistols arrived and positioned themselves in front of the Town Hall where the SS detachments were headquartered. Realising he needed further reinforcements, von Alvensleben summoned a larger force which was based just 4 km away at Dobbiaco. 

Two hours later, 150 men from an infantry training battalion arrived and positioned two heavy machine guns in the square opposite the SS headquarters in the Town Hall. Von Alvensleben demanded Stiller and Bader remain inside with their men. 

However, the young Wehrmacht captain realised he needed additional direction from his superiors at their Bolzano headquarters. By a stroke of luck SS-Obergruppenführer Karl Wolff, the Supreme Commander of all SS forces in Italy, was standing next to General Röttiger when von Alvensleben's call came through. Taking the phone from Röttiger, Wolff volunteered to von Alvensleben that the SS and SD detachments should stand down on his authority - no matter that he lacked it over either of their officers.

Throughout this Stiller and Bader, along with their men, were becoming dangerously belligerent. With the SS and SD corralled in the village square by the Wehrmacht force, it remained an extremely tense situation and a firefight between them was still a real possibility. When one of the British contingent among the prisoners drew the SD troopers’ attention to the firepower they were facing, they finally conceded and began laying down their weapons.

Eventually most of the SS and SD men were allowed to leave the village in a bus and a truck, and were last seen heading towards the Brenner Pass.

Contemporary rumours suggested that the SS and SD men were ambushed by partisans and subsequently captured and strung up from roadside telegraph poles.  It has now been established that this was not true.

Wehrmacht surrender to US Army detachment 

The Prominenten were now free of the SS and SD, but not of danger.  They were still at the mercy of German deserters, fanatical Nazis carrying on the fight, and marauding bands of Italian partisans with scores to settle.

As a courtesy, the Wehrmacht escorted the Prominenten to their original destination, the Hotel Pragser Wildsee. The Luftwaffe generals and their staffs had left; some of the hostages had also disappeared, but the majority elected to stay there under the protection of the Wehrmacht.

Great Escape Wing Commander Harry Day and the Italian resistance leader who had arranged the hostage accommodation at Niederdorf, left the hotel on 1 May to make their way to the US front line in order to persuade US forces to mount a final rescue mission.

Day and his companion finally crossed the US Fifth Army’s lines on 3 May. In the meantime, all German forces in Italy had surrendered with effect from 2 May. However, spasmodic and occasionally fierce fighting between German and US forces continued to take place. Day’s first contact was with elements of the US 88th Division, but they were in no position to mount a rescue bid as they were at least 125 miles from the Pragser Wildsee. On the other hand, the 85th Division’s 339th Infantry Regiment had reached their latest objective at San Candido half an hour after midnight on 4 May.  Just 21 km from Pragser Wildsee, they received immediate orders to send a "strong combat patrol" to rescue the hostages.

G Company of the 339th was nominated for the task and arrived during the early hours of 4 May in a convoy of trucks, jeeps, and armoured carriers.

There was a tense silence as the Wehrmacht machine gunners and the American infantrymen saw each other in the gloom of the dawn, but when the Wehrmacht sentries realised that the soldiers were American and not German foes, they laid down their weapons and surrendered. The Prominenten were now officially liberated, and their Wehrmacht chaperones relieved of their duty.

List of prisoners 
(by country)

References

Sources 
 Sayer Ian & Dronfield Jeremy. Hitler's Last Plot – The 139 VIP hostages Selected for Death in the Final Days of World War II.  New York: Da Capo Press, 2019
 Hans-Günter Richardi, SS-Geiseln in der Alpenfestung  
 Pragser Wildsee.com 
 Peter Koblank: Die Befreiung der Sonder- und Sippenhäftlinge in Südtirol, Online-Edition Mythos Elser 2006 
 ECHO Tirol 10 November 2005 
 , Hostage of the Third Reich: The Story of My Imprisonment and Rescue from the SS, 
 Endgame 1945 The Missing Final Chapter of World War II 
 Klaus-Dietmar Henke, Die amerikanische Besetzung Deutschlands,  
 Kurt von Schuschnigg: Austrian Requiem, Victor Gollancz 1946, London.

Nazi concentration camps
1945 in Germany
Nazi SS
History of Tyrol (region)